Bernadotte Township may refer to the following townships in the United States:

 Bernadotte Township, Fulton County, Illinois
 Bernadotte Township, Nicollet County, Minnesota